Anders Hove (born 16 January 1956) is a Greenlandic actor and director. Hove is best known for his role of the vampire Radu Vladislas in the four Subspecies-movies, Cesar Faison in ABC's General Hospital, Loving, & Port Charles and in the film In the Middle of the Night as Nalle.

Early life
Anders Hove was born in Greenland on 16 January 1956 to Birthe Hovea, a nurse, and Anders Hove, who worked as a meteorologist. His father was politically involved in Greenland and helped the country work toward the government it has today. Spending most of his childhood there, Anders later moved with his parents to Thisted in Denmark when he was 14 years old. In the 1970s, Anders attended the Det Kongelige Teater school in Denmark to learn formal acting. Before this, he had studied law and economics, and had planned on taking over his father's business.

Career
Hove began his professional career in the 1980s, working mostly in Denmark before moving on to horror films in the United States. He soon found work on soap operas in the US and Canada. He has since carved out a place as a popular performer among Danish directors. His first real movie role was in the Danish movie In the Middle of the Night (1984), in which he played Nalle. After working in Denmark for a time as a stage and screen actor, Anders decided to try his luck on the American front. He and his wife sold their belongings and moved to the States. There he landed parts in shows like Tales From the Crypt and the sci-fi movie Critters 4 (direct to video) as 'Rick', the critter-infested ship's captain, and the role that many know and remember him for, as the fiendish and obsessive Cesar Faison on the ABC daytime soap opera General Hospital. Hove also had two crossovers with his character from General Hospital on Loving in 1993 and Port Charles in 2000. He also worked in a Canadian soap opera called Family Passions with General Hospital co-star and friend Kin Shriner (Scott Baldwin). Another former co-star on General Hospital, Michael Watson, suggested that Anders should play the villainous vampire Radu Vladislas in the Full Moon movie Subspecies (1991). He ended up being in three sequels to the movie during the 90s playing the long-fingered, drooling, infamous Radu. Hove returned to Denmark in the mid 90s and has continued to act there, being a favorite actor of the 'Dogme'-directors, usually playing bad guys.

In 1999, Hove returned to General Hospital. Hove made another return in 2012, and continued to make recurring appearances through 2014. Hove about his return in 2012 and beyond said in an interview with Michael Fairman said, "I don't know. At least this time around Faison won't be dead — though that's never stopped him before! They'll probably send him to jail but maybe there will be more down the line." On January 19, 2018, Soap Opera Digest announced Hove's return to General Hospital as Cesar Faison.

Personal life
In 1980, he married an American dancer and choreographer named Ann Thayer Crosset, and together they have two sons. Crosset is the first choreographer to hold a seat on the Danish Council of Arts. Elliot has followed his dad into the acting business. Hove was asked by General Hospital to revive the character of Cesar Faison. He had planned on returning to the United States with his family. His wife acquired an important seat on the Danish Council of the Arts for a four-year term so Hove returned to Los Angeles and roomed with GH veteran Kin Shriner. Missing his family and unhappy about what was going with the character of Faison, Hove stayed for a little under a year before moving back to Denmark.

Filmography

Film

Television

References

Citations

Sources

External links

 
 
 
 
 List of Loving cast and characters

1956 births
Living people
Greenlandic male actors
20th-century American male actors
21st-century American male actors
American male soap opera actors
20th-century Danish male actors
21st-century Danish male actors
Canadian male soap opera actors
20th-century Canadian male actors
Danish male actors